The 2015 season is Port MTI 's 19th season in the Thai Premier League of Port F.C. Football Club.

Thai Premier League

Thai FA Cup 
Chang FA Cup

Thai League Cup 
Toyota League Cup

Squad statistics

Transfers 
First Thai footballer's market is opening on 6 November 2014 to 28 January 2015

Second Thai footballer's market is opening on 3 June 2015 to 30 June 2015

In

Out

Loan in

Loan out 

Bur
2015